An overseer of the poor was an official who administered poor relief such as money, food, and clothing in England and various other countries which derived their law from England such as the United States.

England
In England, overseers of the poor administered poor relief such as money, food and clothing as part of the Poor Law system. The position was created by the Act for the Relief of the Poor 1597.

Overseers of the poor were often reluctant appointees who were unpaid, working under the supervision of a justice of the peace. The law required two overseers to be elected every Easter, and churchwardens or landowners were often selected.

The new system of poor relief reinforced a sense of social hierarchy and provided a way of controlling the 'lower orders'. Overseers of the poor were replaced in the Poor Law Amendment Act 1834, and replaced with boards of guardians, although overseers remained in some places as a method of collecting the poor rate.

Duties
Overseers had four duties:

Estimate how much poor relief money was needed in order to set the poor rate accordingly;
Collect the poor rate;
Distribute poor relief; and
Supervise the poorhouse.

Vermont
Overseers of the Poor in the U.S. state of Vermont were often reluctant but elected, unpaid officers of the town. Towns were sometimes so small in population that a few applicants for aid could overwhelm the budget.

Frequent requests for aid could result in the applicant being sent to a county poor farm where residents were not only expected to work to support themselves, but often to support handicapped or elderly residents, as well. Sometimes the latter predominated, putting an insupportable burden on able-bodied residents.

Relief was obtained when the state took over welfare in 1968.

See also
Poormaster
Overseer (slave plantation)

References

Poor Law in Britain and Ireland
Poverty in the United States
Vermont law